Issam Bassou (born 10 October 1998) is a Moroccan judoka. He won gold medals at the 2019 African Games and the 2018 African Judo Championships in the men's –60 kg category. His brother Imad Bassou is also a judoka.

In 2020, he won the silver medal in the men's 60 kg event at the 2020 African Judo Championships held in Antananarivo, Madagascar.

At the 2021 African Judo Championships held in Dakar, Senegal, he won the gold medal in the men's 60 kg event.

He won one of the bronze medals in the men's 60 kg event at the 2022 Mediterranean Games held in Oran, Algeria.

References

External links
 
 

1998 births
Living people
Moroccan male judoka
African Games medalists in judo
African Games gold medalists for Morocco
Competitors at the 2019 African Games
Place of birth missing (living people)
Competitors at the 2018 Mediterranean Games
Competitors at the 2022 Mediterranean Games
Mediterranean Games bronze medalists for Morocco
Mediterranean Games medalists in judo
21st-century Moroccan people